Anatoly Borisovich Zolotukhin (born March 11, 1946) is a Russian professor of the Gubkin Russian State University of Oil and Gas, expert in petroleum and natural gas industry. In 2008–2014, he was vice-president of the World Petroleum Council.

References

1946 births
Living people
Russian educators
Petroleum engineers
Petroleum industry in Russia
20th-century Russian educators
21st-century Russian educators
20th-century Russian engineers
21st-century Russian engineers